The Grinzane Cavour Prize (1989–2009) was an Italian literary award established in 1982 by Francesco Meotto. The annual award ceremony took place in the medieval castle of Grinzane Cavour. The goal of the prize was to attract young people to read. The voting system was divided into two phases: first, a jury of literary critics selected finalists, and then they chose an overall winner from the pool of finalists. Special prizes for best new author and lifetime achievement were also awarded.

The Grinzane Cavour Prize Association was dissolved on 31 March 2009 as a result of the implication of the organization's president, Giuliano Soria, in an embezzling scheme. Soria used the Grinzane Cavour Prize to gain €4.5 million in government grants which he then appropriated for his personal use. The assets of the organization were acquired by the Monforte d'Alba Bottari Lattes cultural foundation at a bankruptcy auction in 2010.

Prizes

Best Italian Fiction
Finalists, winners in bold
 1982
 Gennaro Manna La casa di Napoli
 Primo Levi Lilit
 Antonio Terzi La fuga delle api
 1983
 Giorgio Vigolo La Virgilia
 Raffaele Crovi Fuori del paradiso
 Cesare Greppi I testimoni
 1984
 Luca Desiato Galileo mio padre
 Virgilio Scapin La giostra degli arcangeli
 Antonio Tabucchi Donna di Porto Pim
 1985
 Sebastiano Vassalli La notte della cometa
 Paolo Barbaro Malalali
 Giuseppe Bonura Il segreto di Alias
 1986
 Giorgio Prodi Lazzaro
 Gianni Celati Narratori delle pianure
 Luigi Santucci Il ballo della sposa
 1987
 Franco Ferrucci Il mondo creato
 Ermanno Olmi Ragazzo della Bovisa
 Nico Orengo Dogana d'amore
 1988
 Vincenzo Consolo Retablo
 Manlio Cancogni Il genio e niente
 Lalla Romano Nei mari estremi
 1989
 Luigi Malerba Testa d'argento
 Stefano Jacomuzzi Un vento sottile
 Raffaele La Capria La neve del Vesuvio
 1990
 Roberto Pazzi Vangelo di Giuda
 Cecilia Kin Autoritratto in rosso
 Alberto Vigevani La casa perduta
 1991
 Giorgio Calcagno Il gioco del prigioniero
 Roberto Mussapi Tusitala
 Ferruccio Parazzoli 1994 - La nudità e la spada
 1992
 Gianni Riotta Cambio di stagione
 Paola Capriolo Il doppio regno
 Vincenzo Cerami L'ipocrita
 1993
 Raffaele Nigro Ombre sull'Ofanto
 Cordelia Edvardson La principessa delle ombre
 Salvatore Mannuzzu La figlia perduta
 1994
 Rossana Ombres Un dio coperto di rose
 Guido Ceronetti D.D. Deliri Disarmati
 Laura Pariani Di corno o d'oro
 1995
 Luca Doninelli Le decorose memorie
 Alberto Arbasino Mekong
 Francesco Biamonti Attesa sul mare
 1996
 Mario Rigoni Stern Le stagioni di Giacomo
 Paolo Barbaro La casa con le luci
 Rosetta Loy Cioccolata da Hanselmann
 1997
 Marco Lodoli Il vento
 Paolo di Stefano Azzurro, troppo azzurro
 Gina Lagorio Il bastardo
 1998
 Daniele Del Giudice Mania
 Silvana La Spina L'amante del Paradiso
 Alessandro Tamburini L'onore delle armi
 1999
 Aurelio Picca Tuttestelle
 Sergio Givone Favola delle cose ultime
 Fabrizia Ramondino L'isola riflessa
 2000
 Filippo Tuena Tutti i sognatori
 Luca Doninelli La nuova era
 Laura Pariani La signora dei porci
 2001
 Diego Marani New Finnish Grammar (Nuova grammatica finlandese)
 Giuseppe Bonura Le notti del cardinale
 Manlio Cancogni Il mister
 2002
 Margaret Mazzantini Non ti muovere
 Arnaldo Colasanti Gatti e scimmie
 Romana Petri La donna delle Azzorre
 2003
 Boris Biancheri Il ritorno a Stomersee
 Alberto Asor Rosa L'alba di un mondo nuovo
 Clara Sereni Passami il sale
 2004
 Elena Gianini Belotti Prima della quiete
 Marina Jarre Ritorno in Lettonia
 Andrea Vitali Una finestra vistalago
 2005
 Alessandro Perissinotto Al mio giudice
 Eraldo Affinati Secoli di gioventu
 Maria Pace Ottieri Abbandonami
 2006
 Tullio Avoledo Tre sono le cose misteriose
 Silvia Di Natale L’ombra del cerro
 Silvana Grasso Disio
 2007
 Marcello Fois Memoria del vuoto
 Gianni Clerici Zoo
 Rosa Matteucci Cuore di mamma
 2008
 Michele Mari Verderame
 Elisabetta Rasy L’estranea
 Serena Vitale L’imbroglio del turbante

Best Foreign Fiction
Finalists, winners in bold

 1982
 Michael Crichton Congo
 Tadeusz Konwicki A Minor Apocalypse
 Vladimir Maksimov The Ballad of Sawa
 1983
 Yuri Rytkheu A Dream in a Polar Fog
 Jorge Amado Os Pastores da Noite
 Thomas Bernhard Gargoyles
 1984
 Nathalie Sarraute Enfance
 Yordan Radichkov Tales of Cerkazki
 Amos Tutuola My Life in the Bush of Ghosts
 1985
 Truls Ora Romanen om Helge Hauge
 Nadine Gordimer July's People
 Kurt Vonnegut Deadeye Dick
 1986
 Bernard-Henri Lévy Le diable en tête
 Wole Soyinka, Daniel O. Fagunwa The Forest of A Thousand Demons
 Mario Vargas Llosa The Real Life of Alejandro Mayta
 1987
 Graham Swift Waterland
 Jean Lévi The Chinese Emperor
 José Saramago The Year of the Death of Ricardo Reis
 1988
 Wilma Stockenström The Expedition to the Baobab Tree
 Julian Barnes Flaubert's Parrot
 Eduardo Mendoza Garriga La ciudad de los prodigios
 1989
 Doris Lessing The Fifth Child
 Leonid Borodin Partings
 Marvel Moreno En diciembre llegaban las brisas
 1990
 Alfredo Conde Xa Vai O Griffon No Vento
 Thorsten Becker The Hostage
 Tatjana Tolstaja On the Golden Porch, and other stories
 1991
 Michel Tournier Le Medianoche amoureux
 Ian McEwan Black Dogs
 Edna O'Brien Girl with Green Eyes
 1992
 Izrail Metter The Fifth Corner of the Room
 Adolfo Bioy Casares Las vísperas de Fausto
 Ismail Kadaré Chronicle in Stone
 1993
 Homero Aridjis The Life and Times of Juan Cabezón of Castile
 Jean d'Ormesson Histoire du juif errant
 Anita Desai Baumgartner's Bombay
 1994
 Cees Nooteboom The Following Story
 Ben Okri The Famished Road
 A. B. Yehoshua Five Seasons
 1995
 Robert Schneider Brother of Sleep
 René Depestre Le Mât de cocagne
 Aidan Mathews Lipstick on the Host
 1996
 Paulo Coelho The Alchemist
 Lars Gustafsson The Tale of a Dog
 Michael Ondaatje Coming Through Slaughter
 1997
 David Grossman The Zigzag Kid
 Álvaro Mutis Abdul Bashur, soñador de navíos
 Bernhard Schlink The Reader
 1998
 Yu Hua To Live
 Ismail Kadare The Pyramid
 Candia McWilliam Debatable Land
 1999
 Andrew Miller Ingenious Pain
 Jean Rouaud The World, More or Less
 D. J. Taylor English Settlement
 2000
 Michael Cunningham The Hours
 Tahar Ben Jelloun L'Auberge des pauvres
 Ursula Hegi Stones from the River
 2001
 Chaim Potok In the Beginning
 Amin Maalouf Balthasar's Odyssey
 Antonio Skarmeta La boda del poeta
 2002
 Orhan Pamuk My Name Is Red
 Alfredo Bryce Tarzan's Tonsillitis
 Cristoph Hein Willenbrock
 2003
 Javier Cercas Soldiers of Salamis
 Miljenko Jergović Mama Leone
 Ahmadou Kourouma Allah is not obliged
 2004
 Natasha Radojcic-Kane Homecoming
 Péter Esterházy Celestial Harmonies: A Novel
 Édouard Glissant Le Quatrième Siècle
 2005
 Rosa Montero La loca de la casa
 Thomas Hettche Der Fall Arbogast, 
 Duong Thu Huong Beyond Illusions
 2006
 Laura Restrepo Delirio
 Gamal El-Ghitani Schegge di fuoco
 Miguel Sousa Tavares Equador
 2007
 Pascal Mercier Night Train to Lisbon
 Alaa Al Aswany Yacoubian Building
 Philippe Forest Toute la nuit,
 2008
 Bernardo Atxaga Il libro di mio fratello
 Ingo Schulze Neue Leben
 Lyudmila Ulitskaya Sincerely Yours, Shurik

Lifetime Achievement Award
 1986 Giorgio Melchiori, English
 1987 Oreste Macrì, Spanish
 1988 Magda Olivetti, German
 1989 Carlo Bo, French
 1990 Eridano Bazzarelli, Russian
 1991 Giovanni Bogliolo, French
 1992 Pietro Marchesani, Polish
 1993 Carlo Carena, Latin
 1994 Giovanni Raboni, French
 1995 Renata Colorni, German
 1996 Glauco Felici, Spanish
 1997 Agostino Lombardo, English
 1998 Luca Canali, Latin
 1999 Maria Luisa Spaziani, French
 2000 Gian Piero Bona, French
 2001 Umberto Gandini, German
 2002 Ettore Capriolo, English
 2003 Fernanda Pivano, English
 2004 Hado Lyria, Spanish
 2005 Serena Vitale, Russian
 2006 Isabella Camera d'Afflitto, Arabic
 2007 Renata Pisu, Chinese
 2008 Giorgio Amitrano, Japanese
 2009 Alessandro Serpieri, English

Best Young Author
 1990 Andrea Canobbio Vasi cinesi
 1991 Luca Damiani Guardati a vista, Enzo Muzii Punto di non ritorno
 1992 Marco Alloni La luna nella Senna
 1993 Allen Kurzweil A Case of Curiosities
 1994 Silvana Grasso Nebbie di ddraunara
 1995 Giuseppe Culicchia Tutti giù per terra
 1996 Alessandro Barbero Bella vita e guerre altrui di Mr. Pyle, gentiluomo
 1997 Gianni Farinetti Un delitto fatto in casa
 1998 Lorenzo Pavolini Senza Rivoluzione
 1999 Rosa Matteucci Lourdes
 2000 Younis Tawfik La straniera
 2001 Richard Mason The Drowning People
 2002 Davide Longo Un mattino  Irgalem
 2003 Elena Loewenthal Lo strappo nell’anima
 2004 Sayed Kashua Dancing Arabs
 2005 Rupa Bajwa The Sari Shop, Siddharth Dhanvant Shanghvi The Last Song of Dusk
 2006 Steven Hayward The Secret Mitzvah of Lucio Burke, Ornela Vorpsi Il paese dove non si muore mai
 2007 Yasmine Ghata The Calligraphers' Night, Hélène Grimaud Wild Harmonies
 2008 Léonora Miano Dark heart of the night

International Award
 1991 Julien Green
 1992 Günter Grass
 1993 Czeslaw Milosz
 1994 Carlos Fuentes
 1995 Bohumil Hrabal
 1996 Kenzaburō Ōe
 1997 Yves Bonnefoy
 1998 Jean Starobinski
 1999 Vidiadhar S. Naipaul
 2000 Manuel Vazquez Montalban
 2001 Doris Lessing, Toni Morrison
 2002 Daniel Pennac
 2003 John Maxwell Coetzee
 2004 Mario Vargas Llosa
 2005 Anita Desai
 2006 Derek Walcott
 2007 Amitav Ghosh
 2008 Don DeLillo

Best Non-fiction
 1996 Pietro Citati La colomba pugnalata
 1997 Daria Galateria Le fughe del Re Sole
 1998 Giuliano Baioni Il giovane Goethe
 2000 Cesare Segre 
 2002 Paolo Cesaretti Teodora, Gian Carlo Roscioni Il desiderio delle Indie
 2007 Alberto Manguel Diario di un lettore

Grinzane Publishing Award
 2001 Hans Magnus Enzensberger
 2002 André Schiffrin
 2003 Antoine Gallimard
 2004 Odile Jacob
 2005 Jorge Herralde
 2006 Ulla Unseld-Berkéwicz
 2007 Ellen W. Faran

Reading Prize, Fondazione CRT
 2006 Assia Djebar
 2007 Nadine Gordimer
 2008 Adunis

Special Prize
 1985 Giorgio Dell'Arti Vita di Cavour
 1986 Nuto Revelli L’anello forte
 1987 Paolo Paulucci Alla corte di Re Umberto, Giorgio Calcagno
 1988 Georges Virlogeux
 1989 Marcello Staglieno Un santo borghese
 1990 Virginia Galante Garrone Nel transito del vento
 1995 Wole Soyinka
 2001 Toni Morrison
 2006 Rigoberta Menchú
 2008 Aharon Appelfeld Badenheim 1939

Intercontinental Dialogue Award
 2006 Hanif Kureishi, Richard Ford

References

External links
Official site
"Premio Grinzane Cavour - An Award in the hands of children."

Italian literary awards
Awards established in 1982
Awards disestablished in 2009
1982 establishments in Italy